Kallaste is a town in Peipsiääre Parish, Tartu County, Estonia. It is located on the western shore of Lake Peipus. Most of the population are Russians, 15% being Estonians.

History
Kallaste was founded in the 18th century as a village of Russian Old Believers. It became a small borough (alevik) in 1921 and a town 1 May 1938.

Gallery

References

External links

Former municipalities of Estonia
Cities and towns in Estonia
Populated places in Tartu County
18th-century establishments in Estonia
Populated places established in the 18th century
Old Believer communities
Russians in Estonia